Histoire TV is a French television channel, owned by Groupe TF1. The network mainly carries programming about historical events.

History
Histoire was launched on 14 July 1997 by an alliance of public holdings (France Télévisions, INA and La Sept-Arte) and private shareholders (Pathé, Wanadoo and Suez).

In June 2004, the Groupe TF1 acquired fully Histoire, privatizing it.

On 2 January 2012, the TF1 pay-TV channels joined ISP optional packages. Previously, Histoire was exclusively available on TPS, Canalsat and for 0.49€ on Free.

In December 2012, Discovery Communications acquired 20% of TF1 pay-TV thematic channels for €170 million for Eurosport and €14 million for Ushuaïa TV, Histoire, Stylia and TV Breizh.

On 17 July 2015, TF1 sold its remaining 49% stake in Eurosport to Discovery Communications for €492 million. At the same time, the French group bought out the 20% stake held by the American group in its pay-TV channels (TV Breizh, Histoire and Ushuaïa) for 14.6 million euros.

Patrick Buisson, who was the channel managing director from 2007 to 2018, had his son Georges hired there until the latter was "exfiltrated" from the Stylia channel after disagreements with his father.

On 4 December 2019, TV Breizh, Ushuaïa TV and Histoire were rebranded with a "TV" logo common between them.

Its competitor is Toute l'Histoire.

References

Television networks in France
Television channels and stations established in 1997
1997 establishments in France
Television stations in France
French-language television stations